Encyclia hanburyi is a species of orchid.

hanburyi